Högby Lighthouse is a Swedish lightstation. The lighthouse is built of iron and painted white. The design by architect Johan Höjer is unique to Sweden. The tower was exhibited at the Stockholm Exposition in 1897 before being located in Högby on a narrow peninsula. The flame ran on kerosene at first, and was updated with a gas mantle light in 1908. It was electrified in 1945 with a 1000 watt bulb and fully automated in 1967. Today the light runs with a faint 60 watt bulb, and the old rotating Fresnel lens has been replaced. The lighthouse is owned by The Swedish Maritime Administration.

Both the keeper's house and lighthouse is protected as a culturally important building since 1978. Today the keeper's house is a private residence to an artist and contains an art studio and showroom.

Gallery

See also
 List of lighthouses and lightvessels in Sweden

References

External links

 Sjofartsverket  
 The Swedish Lighthouse Society

Lighthouses completed in 1898
Lighthouses in Sweden
Öland